MDs (Medical Doctors) is an American medical drama television series that aired on ABC from September 25 to December 11, 2002. It starred William Fichtner as Dr. Bruce Kellerman, Jane Lynch as Aileen Poole, and John Hannah as Dr. Robert Dalgety. The series only lasted one season, and though 11 episodes were filmed, only 8 were ever aired. The series was never released on DVD and it is very hard to find. The only known full length episodes of MDs can be found on YouTube. MDs was written and created by Gary Tieche.

Dr. Robert Dalgety, a dedicated and brilliant general surgeon, and Dr. Bruce Kellerman, head of cardiothoracic surgery, are two renegade surgeons working together in a megasized, megafrugal, aging HMO. With the help of Dr. Quinn Joyner and Dr. Maggie Yang, they buck the system any way they can in pursuit of the care patients need and deserve. On the opposing team are Shelly Pangborn, the new hospital administrator, and assistant hospital administrator, Frank Coones. Together with Nurse "Doctor" Poole, they are more concerned with the bottom line than patients' health.

Cast 
 William Fichtner as Dr. Bruce Kellerman
 Jane Lynch as Aileen Poole
 John Hannah as Dr. Robert Dalgety
 Leslie Stefanson as Shelly Pangborn
 Aunjanue Ellis as Quinn Joyner
 Michaela Conlin as Dr. Maggie Yang
 Robert Joy as Frank Coones
 Wade Williams as Big Thor Amundsen
 Thomas Lennon as Chester E. Donge

Production
Very little is known about the production of MDs. The show was pitched by Gary Tieche to ABC under the working title The Oath. The name was later changed to Meds, and finally changed again to MDs although still pronounced as 'Meds.' Twelve episodes were filmed, and they were aired out of order, which some blame for the ratings decline evident during its run. The third episode filmed "Connective Tissue" (with production code H232) was never aired; however, "Wing and a Prayer," the final episode filmed (with production code H241), aired seventh on December 4, 2002. The episode with production code H239 was filmed; however, no information on the episode title, director, or writer have been released. Throughout its run, eight episodes of MDs aired. A ninth episode entitled "Family Secrets" was scheduled to air on December 18, 2002; however, the show was cancelled on December 17, 2002, and was permanently removed from ABC's schedule.

Episodes

Awards and nominations 
Cinematographer Robert Primes won an award for Outstanding Achievement in Cinematography in Episodic TV Series from the American Society of Cinematographers for the seventh episode: "Wing and a Prayer".

References

External links
 

2000s American drama television series
English-language television shows
2002 American television series debuts
2002 American television series endings
American Broadcasting Company original programming
2000s American medical television series
Television shows set in San Francisco
Television series by ABC Studios